A hanging basket is a suspended container used for growing decorative plants. Typically they are hung from buildings, where garden space is at a premium, and from street furniture for environmental enhancement. They may also be suspended from free standing frames sometimes called hanging basket trees. One type of hanging basket is the inverted planter where plants are grown in an upside down pot and are watered from the top.

Structure
Hanging baskets are normally made from wire with an impervious, usually plastic, lining to retain the contents. They are filled with peat-free compost usually with a water-retaining gel and controlled release fertiliser granules. Typically they are planted with bedding plants and may include geraniums, fuchsia, and trailing plants around the edges such as lobelia.

Criticism

Safety concerns have been raised over hanging baskets. In February 2004, Suffolk County Council ruled there was a risk that baskets, part of the annual summer floral displays in Bury St Edmunds, could fall from lampposts and injure the public. After an outcry this decision was reversed the following month. Because of hosepipe bans due to drought, local authorities in South East England reduced the number of hanging baskets in public displays in spring 2006.

References

External links

Garden vases